Monika Oražem (born 9 May 1993 in Ljubljana) is a Slovenian professional triathlete, National Sprint Triathlon Champion of the year 2009, and National Sprint Duathlon Champion of the year 2010. According to the Olympic Simulation (August 2011),, she would be a reserve member of the Slovenian team at the Olympic Games in London 2012.

Sports career 
Monika Oražem started triathlon in 2004, at the age of 11, and from 2007 on she has regularly taken part in ITU competitions.

Monika Oražem takes part in the prestigious French Club Championship Series Lyonnaise des Eaux representing SAS (Saint Avertin Sports) Tri 37.
At the opening triathlon of the 2011 circuit in Nice (24 April 2011), Oražem placed 10th, in Paris (9 July 2011) 24th, thus proving to be the best female triathlete of her club.
For the experimental relay type Grand Prix triathlon in Tours (28 August 2011) she was consequently chosen as the decisive finalist and solo runner but this time she could not outdo her teammates.

In Slovenia, Oražem represents Triatlon klub Inles Riko Ribnica.

ITU Competitions 

In the four years from 2007 to 2010, Oražem took part in 20 ITU competitions and achieved 17 top ten positions. In 2011 Oražem took part in her first Elite competition, i.e. the Mixed Relay at the European Championships in Pontevedra.

The following list is based upon the official ITU rankings and the ITU Athletes's Profile Page.
Unless indicated otherwise, the following events are triathlons (Olympic Distance) and refer to the Elite category.

DNF = did not finish · DNS = did not start

External links 
 Orazem's Website in Slovenian
 Triatlon klub Inles Riko Ribnica in Slovenian
 Slovenian Triathlon Federation in Slovenian

Notes 

Slovenian female triathletes
1993 births
Living people
Sportspeople from Ljubljana
Triathletes at the 2010 Summer Youth Olympics